The Brecon Buff Goose is a breed of domestic goose originating in Wales.

History 

The Brecon Buff Goose originated in the area of the Brecon Beacons, in Breconshire in Wales. In about 1929 a certain Rhys Llewellyn found and acquired three geese of a uniform buff colour not seen in any other British goose breed. Using a gander of Embden type, he bred them until a stable true-breeding population was established. A standard was drawn up, and in 1934 was published in Feathered World. It was first included in the British Poultry Standards of the Poultry Club of Great Britain in 1954.

Characteristics 

The plumage is buff. The Brecon Buff Goose is distinguished from its larger relative, the American Buff Goose, not only by its weight but also by its pink feet and beak, which are characteristic of this breed.

References

See also
 List of goose breeds

Goose breeds originating in Wales
Animal breeds on the RBST Watchlist